Serpentine is a terpene indole alkaloid produced by several members of the family Apocynaceae, including Catharanthus roseus and Rauvolfia serpentina.

See also 
Vinervine
Akuammicine

References

Alkaloids found in Apocynaceae